Norman Leo Geisler (July 21, 1932 – July 1, 2019) was an American Christian systematic theologian and philosopher. He was the co-founder of two non-denominational evangelical seminaries (Veritas International University and Southern Evangelical Seminary).

He held a Ph.D. in philosophy from Loyola University and made scholarly contributions to the subjects of classical Christian apologetics, systematic theology, the history of philosophy, philosophy of religion, Calvinism, Roman Catholicism, Biblical inerrancy, Bible difficulties, ethics, and more. He was the author, coauthor, or editor of over 90 books and hundreds of articles.

One of the primary architects of the Chicago Statement on Biblical Inerrancy, Geisler was well noted within the United States evangelical community for his stalwart defense of Biblical inerrancy.

Education
Geisler's education included a Th.B. (1964) from William Tyndale College, B.A. in philosophy (1958) and M.A. in theology (1960) from Wheaton College, and a Ph.D. in philosophy from Loyola University. He had additional graduate work at Wayne State University, the University of Detroit, and Northwestern University in Evanston, Illinois.

Biography
Norman Leo Geisler was born on July 21, 1932, in Warren, Michigan, a suburb of Detroit. He attended a nondenominational, evangelical church from age nine but was not converted until the age of eighteen. He immediately began attempting to share his faith with others in various evangelistic endeavors—door-to-door, street meetings, and jail service, rescue missions, and Youth for Christ venues. Some of his conversations forced him to realize that he needed to find better answers to the objections he was hearing. He subsequently earned two bachelor's degrees, two master's degrees, and a Doctorate.

Geisler's decades of degree work overlap a professorial career begun at Detroit Bible College (1963–66) and continued at Trinity Evangelical Divinity School (1969–70) and Trinity College (1970–71). He was later Chairman of Philosophy of Religion at Trinity Evangelical Divinity School (1970–79) and Professor of Systematic Theology at Dallas Theological Seminary (1979–88).

In 1981, Geisler testified in "the Scopes II trial" (McLean v. Arkansas Board of Education). Duane Gish, a creationist, remarked: "Geisler was... the lead witness for the creationist side and one of its most brilliant witnesses. His testimony, in my view (I was present during the entire trial), effectively demolished the most important thrust of the case by the ACLU. Unfortunately, in my opinion, no testimony, and no effort by any team of lawyers, no matter how brilliant, could have won the case for the creationist side."

Geisler was formerly a president of the Evangelical Theological Society but left the ETS in 2003, after it did not expel Clark Pinnock, who advocated open theism. Geisler also founded and was first president of The Evangelical Philosophical Society. Additionally, he was the founder and first president of the International Society of Christian Apologetics.

In 1997, Geisler co-authored When Cultists Ask: A Popular Handbook on Cultic Misinterpretation. He contributed to The Counterfeit Gospel of Mormonism.

In 2008, Geisler co-founded the Veritas Evangelical Seminary (now Veritas International University) in Santa Ana, California. The seminary offers master's degrees in theological studies, apologetics, biblical studies, and Divinity. Geisler served as Chancellor, Distinguished Professor of Apologetics and Theology, and occupant of the Norman L. Geisler Chair of Christian Apologetics. He retired from this post in May 2019.

Personal
Geisler was married to Barbara Jean Cate for 64 years, and together they had six children: Ruth, David, Daniel, Rhoda, Paul, and Rachel. He died of cerebral thrombosis at a hospital in Charlotte, North Carolina on July 1, 2019, 20 days before his 87th birthday. Geisler's funeral was held at Calvary Church in Charlotte, North Carolina.  Ravi Zacharias gave the eulogy.

Outline of Geisler's apologetic system
Geisler is known first and foremost as a classical Christian apologist. Between 1970 and 1990 he participated in dozens of public debates and gained a reputation as a defender of theism, biblical miracles, the resurrection of Jesus, and the reliability of the Bible. The first attempt to publish an outline of his apologetic method showed up in an appendix of his 1990 book When Skeptics Ask. The appendix is titled "Reasoning to Christianity from Ground Zero" and in it we see a high-level view of the holistic system of classical apologetics he had been developing over the years. The first outline contained fourteen points of argument:

 There are self-evident truths (e.g., "I exist," "Logic applies to reality").
 Truth corresponds to reality.
 Truth is knowable (all other views are self-defeating).
 One can proceed from self-evident truths to the existence of God.
 The argument from Creation (proceeds from "I exist") 
 The argument from morals (proceeds from "Values are undeniable")
 The argument from design (proceeds from "Design implies a designer")
 God is a necessary Being (argument from being).
 My existence is not necessary (evident from the definition of a necessary Being).
 Therefore, theism is true (there is a necessary Being beyond the world who has created the contingent things in the world and intervenes in the world). 
 The objection from the problem of evil can be solved. 
 The objection to miracles can be solved.
 The Bible is a historically reliable document. 
 History is an objective study of the past. 
 There is great historical, archaeological, and scientific evidence to confirm the reliability of the Bible. (Corollary: The Bible gives a reliable record of the teaching of Jesus Christ.)
 Jesus claimed to be both fully human and fully God.
 He gave evidence to support this claim. 
 The fulfillment of prophecy 
 His miraculous and sinless life 
 His resurrection
 Therefore, Jesus is both fully human and fully God.
 Whatever God teaches is true.
 Jesus (God) taught that the Old Testament was the inspired Word of God and He promised the New Testament.
 Therefore, both the Old and New Testaments are the inspired Word of God.

The overview of his system was later streamlined slightly into a 12-point schema. As of 1999, it could be summarized as follows:

 Truth about reality is knowable.
 Opposites cannot both be true (The Law of Noncontradiction).
 It is true the theistic God exists.
 If God exists, then miracles are possible.
 Miracles performed in connection with a truth claim are acts of God to confirm the truth of God through a messenger of God.
 The New Testament is historically reliable.
 As witnessed in the New Testament, Jesus claimed to be God.
 Jesus's claim to divinity was proven by miracles, especially the Resurrection.
 Therefore, Jesus is God.
 Because Jesus is God, whatever Jesus affirmed as true, is true.
 Jesus affirmed that the Bible is the Word of God.
 Therefore, it is true that the Bible is the Word of God and whatever is opposed to any biblical truth is false.

These same twelve steps served as the framework for the chapters of the highly popular book I Don't Have Enough Faith to be an Atheist in 2004 and in his 2012 book Twelve Points that Show Christianity is True.

Theology
Geisler was a conservative evangelical scholar who wrote a four-volume systematic theology which was later condensed into a 1,660 page one-volume tome.

He defended the full inerrancy of the Bible, being one of the co-founders and framers of the "Chicago Statement on Biblical Inerrancy" (1978) and editor of the book Inerrancy (Zondervan, 1978). His notoriety as a defender of the Bible started to grow after co-authoring (with William Nix) General Introduction to the Bible (Moody Press, 1968, 1986) and From God to Us, revised (Moody, 1974, 2012). He co-authored Defending Inerrancy with William Roach (Baker, 2013) and proceeded to start the blogsite https://defendinginerrancy.com with William Roach and others. He wrote the forward to the book Explaining Biblical Inerrancy (Bastion Books, 2013), a compilation of all of the Chicago Statements on Biblical Inerrancy, Biblical Hermeneutics, and Biblical Application, the official ICBI commentary on the first statement by R.C. Sproul, and the official ICBI commentary on the second statement by Norm Geisler. The last book Norm wrote was Preserving Orthodoxy (Bastion Books 2017), which explains how to "maintain continuity with the historic Christian faith on Scripture" and gives Norm's perspective on the inerrancy-related controversies he had been engaged in with Robert Gundry, Clark Pinnock, and Michael Licona.  

Geisler considered himself a "moderate Calvinist", as expressed in his book Chosen but Free (Harvest House, 2001) and Systematic Theology, in One Volume (Harvest House, 2012). On the Five Points of Calvinism, he believed:

Total depravity extends to the whole person but does not destroy the image of God in fallen human beings;
Election is unconditional from the standpoint of God's giving it and only one condition for humans receiving it—faith;
The atonement is unlimited in its scope—Christ died for all mankind—but limited in its application to only the elect;
Grace is irresistible on the willing but does not force the unwilling;
All those who are regenerate will, by God's grace, persevere to the end and be saved.

Ethics
Geisler wrote two significant books on ethics: Christian Ethics and The Christian Love Ethic. He provided his perspective on ethical options, abortion, infanticide, euthanasia, biomedical issues, capital punishment, war, civil disobedience, sexual issues, homosexuality, marriage and divorce, ecology, animal rights, drugs, gambling, pornography, birth control, and more.

Of the six major ethical systems (antinomianism, situationalism, generalism, unqualified absolutism, conflicting absolutism, and graded absolutism), Geisler advocated graded absolutism, which is a theory of moral absolutism which affirms that in moral conflicts we are obligated to perform the higher moral duty. Moral absolutism is the ethical view that certain actions are absolutely right or wrong regardless of other contexts such as their consequences or the intentions behind them. Graded absolutism is moral absolutism but clarifies that a moral absolute, like "Do not kill", can be greater or lesser than another moral absolute, like "Do not lie". Graded absolutism is also called "contextual absolutism" but is not to be confused with situational ethics. The conflict is resolved in acting according to the greater absolute. That is why graded absolutism is also called the "greater good view", but is not to be confused with utilitarianism (see also prima facie right).

Geisler believed the American Revolution was not justified by the standards of either the Bible or just war theory. However, he was not a pacifist, believing that defensive wars are justified but revolutions are not.

Works 
The following is a list of books authored, co-authored or edited by Dr. Norman Geisler.

 A General Introduction to the Bible  (Moody, 1968)
 Christ the Theme of the Bible  (Moody, 1968 | Bastion Books, 2012)
 Ethics: Alternatives and Issues  (Zondervan, 1971)
 The Christian Ethic of Love (Zondervan, 1973)
 Philosophy of Religion (Zondervan, 1974)
 From God to Us  (Moody, 1974)
 * To Understand the Bible Look for Jesus (1975, reprint and retitle of Christ: The Theme of the Bible)
 Christian Apologetics  (Baker, 1976)
 A Popular Survey of the Old Testament (Baker, 1977)
 The Roots of Evil  (Zondervan, 1978) (Second edition, Zondervan, 1981)
 Inerrancy (Zondervan, 1979)
 Introduction to Philosophy: A Christian Perspective  (Baker, 1980)
 Options in Contemporary Christian Ethics  (Baker, 1981)
 Biblical Errancy: Its Philosophical Roots  (Zondervan, 1981 | Bastion Books, 2013)
 Decide for Yourself: How History Views the Bible  (Zondervan, 1982)
 The Creator in the Courtroom “Scopes II “: The 1981 Arkansas Creation-Evolution Trial (Baker, 1982)
 What Augustine Says (Baker, 1982 | Bastion Books, 2013)
 Is Man the Measure?  An Evaluation of Contemporary Humanism (Baker, 1983)
 Cosmos: Carl Sagan's Religion for the Scientific Mind (Quest, 1983)
 Religion of the Force  (Quest, 1983)
 To Drink or Not to Drink: A Sober Look at the Problem (Quest, 1984)
 Perspectives: Understanding and Evaluating Today's World Views  (Here’s Life, 1984)
 Christianity Under Attack (Quest, 1985)
 False Gods of Our Time : A Defense of the Christian Faith  (Harvest House, 1985)
 A General Introduction to the Bible, Second Edition, Revised and Expanded (Moody, 1986)(Third Edition with revisions and expansion underway as of 2019 with projected publish date in 2021.)
 Reincarnation Sensation (Tyndale, 1986)
 Origin Science (Baker, 1987)
 Philosophy of Religion  (Expansion and Revision of #5. Baker, 1988| Bastion Books, 2021?)
 Signs and Wonders (Tyndale, 1988 | Bastion Books, 2019)
 * Worlds Apart : A Handbook on World Views  (Baker. Reprint and retitle of #22)
 Knowing the Truth About Creation (Servant, 1989 | Bastion Books, 2013)
 The Infiltration of the New Age  (Tyndale, 1989)
 The Battle for the Resurrection  (Thomas Nelson, 1989 | Bastion Books, 2013)
 Apologetics in the New Age  (Baker, 1990)
 Come Let Us Reason: An Introduction to Logical Thinking  (Baker, 1990)
 When Skeptics Ask: A Handbook on Christian Evidences  (Baker, 1990, 2013)
 Gambling: A Bad Bet (Fleming H. Revel, 1990 | Bastion Books, 2013)
 The Life and Death Debate  (Greenwood, 1990)
 In Defense of the Resurrection  (Quest, 1991 | Bastion Books, 2015)
 Thomas Aquinas: An Evangelical Appraisal  (Baker, 1991)
 Matters of Life and Death: Calm Answers to Tough Questions  (Baker, 1991)
 Miracles and the Modern Mind: A Defense of Biblical Miracles (Baker, 1992 | Bastion Books, 2012)
 When Critics Ask: A Handbook on Bible Difficulties (Victor, 1992)
 Answering Islam (Baker, 1993)
 Roman Catholics and Evangelicals: Agreements and Differences (Baker, 1995)
 Love is Always Right  (Word, 1996)
 Creating God in the Image of Man?  (Bethany, 1997)
 When Cultists Ask  (Baker, 1997)
 The Counterfeit Gospel of Mormonism  (Harvest House, 1998)
 Legislating Morality  (Bethany, 1998)
 Baker's Encyclopedia of Christian Apologetics (Baker, 1999)
 Chosen But Free : A Balanced view of God's Sovereignty and Free Will  (Bethany, 1999)
 Unshakable Foundations (Bethany, 2001)
 Why I Am a Christian : Leading Thinkers Explain Why they Believe  (Baker, 2001)
 The Battle for God: Responding to the Challenge of Neotheism  (Kregel, 2001)
 Living Loud: Defending Your Faith (Broadman & Holman, 2002)
 Answering Islam, Updated and Revised (Bethany, 2002)
 Who Made God?  (Zondervan, 2003)
 Is Your Church Ready?  Motivating Leaders to Live an Apologetic Life  (Zondervan, 2003)
 I Don't Have Enough Faith to Be an Atheist  (Crossway, 2004)
 Systematic Theology, Vol. 1  (Bethany, 2002)
 Systematic Theology, Vol. 2  (Bethany, 2003)
 Systematic Theology, Vol. 3  (Bethany, 2004)
 Systematic Theology, Vol. 4  (Bethany, 2005)
 Bringing Your Faith to Work: Answers for Break-Room Skeptics  (Baker, 2005)
 * Correcting the Cults: Expert Responses to Their Scripture Twisting   (Baker, 2005, reprint of #….)
 * Why I Am a Christian : Leading Thinkers Explain why They Believe (revised for Baker, 2006)
 Integrity at Work : Finding Your Ethical Compass in a Post-Enron World  (Baker, 2007)
 Creation  and the Courts: Eighty Years of Conflict in the Classroom and the Courtroom  (Crossway, 2007)
 A Popular Survey of the New Testament (Baker, 2007)
 Love Your Neighbor: Thinking Wisely about Right and Wrong  (Crossway, 2007)
 Reasons for Faith: Making a Case for the Christian Faith  (Crossway, 2007)
 Conviction Without Compromise: Standing Strong in the Core Beliefs of the Christian Faith  (Harvest House, 2008)
 The Apologetics of Jesus: A Caring Approach to Dealing with Doubters   (Baker, 2008)
 Conversational Evangelism (Harvest House, 2008)
 Is Rome the True Church? (Crossway, 2008)
 * The Big Book of Bible Difficulties (Baker 2008, reprint of #43)
 * Making Sense of Bible Difficulties (Baker, 2009, abridgement of #43)
 Chosen But Free: A Balanced View of God's Sovereignty and Free Will  (third edition, revised and expanded, Bethany, 2010)
 Christian Ethics, Second Edition (Baker, 2010)
 If God, Why Evil?  (Bethany, 2011)
 Systematic Theology in One Volume  (Bethany, 2011)
 Defending Inerrancy: Affirming the Accuracy of Scriptures for a New Generation   (Baker, 2012)(Revision and expansion underway as of 2019 by Dr. Bill Roach will include much of Norm’s thought and writings on the defense of inerrancy between 2011 and 2019.)
 Reasons for Belief : Easy-to-Understand Answers to 10 Essential Questions  (Bethany, 2012)
 Reasons for Belief Study Guide (Bastion Books, 2014)
 A Popular Handbook of Biblical Archaeology: Discoveries that Confirm the Reliability of Scripture   (Bethany, 2012)
 The Big Book of Christian Apologetics   (Baker, 2012) (Minor revision of The Baker Encyclopedia of Christian Apologetics)
 * Christian Apologetics  (revised, Baker, 2012)
 Twelve Points that Show Christianity is True  (NGIM, 2012)
 Explaining Biblical Inerrancy: The Chicago Statements on Biblical Inerrancy, Hermeneutics, and Application with Official ICBI Commentary (Bastion Books, 2013)
 * The Christian Ethic of Love (2012, a minor revision of #4)
 From God to Us (Moody, 2012) (a major revision and update of #6 with some additions from #25.)
 Is the Pope Infallible: A Look at the Evidence  (Bastion Books, 2012)
 * The Roots of Evil , Third Edition (Bastion Books, 2013. A Minor revision of #4)
 Should Believers Make Ashes of Themselves? Cremation, the Burning Question  (Bastion, 2013)
 * Should Old Aquinas Be Forgotten?  (Bastion Books, 2013. Revision and expansion of #37)
 The Atheist's Fatal Flaw  (Baker, 2014)
 The Jesus Quest: the Danger from Within  (Xulon, 2014)
 The Bible's Answer to 100 of Life's Biggest Questions  (Baker, 2015)
 The Shack: Helpful or Hurtful?  (Bastion Books, 2011)
 Teacher's Guide to Twelve Points That Show Christianity is True (NGIM, 2012).
 Beware of Philosophy  (Bastion Books, 2012)
 A History of Western Philosophy: Vol 1: Ancient and Medieval  (Bastion Books, 2012)
 A History of Western Philosophy: Vol 2: Modern and Contemporary  (Bastion Books, 2012)
 * A Handbook on World Views: A Catalogue for Worldview Shoppers  (Bastion Books, 2013) (A minor revision of Worlds Apart) 
 * Biblical Inerrancy: The Historical Evidence  (Bastion Books, 2013)(A minor Revision of #15)
 * What in Cremation is Going On? (Bastion Books, 2014) (Abridgement of # 86)
 The Official Study Guide to I Don't Have Enough Faith to be an Atheist  (Xulon Press, 2014)
 The Religion of the Force  (Bastion Books, 2015) (Update and expansion of #19)
 God: A Philosophical Argument  (Bastion Books, 2015)
 Evidence of an Early New Testament Canon  (Bastion Books, 2015)
 Romans in Logical Form (Bastion Books, 2015)
 Vital Issues in the Inerrancy Debate (Wipf & Stock, 2016) (review)
 How to Know God  (Bastion Books, 2016)(In English and Spanish)
 A Prolegomena to Evangelical Theology  (Bastion Books, 2016)
 A Popular Survey of Bible Doctrine (Bastion Books, 2015)
 A Prolegomena to Evangelical Theology (Bastion Books, 2016)
 The Bible: Its Origin, Nature and Collection: NGIM Guide to Bible Doctrine, Book 1 (NGIM.org, 2015)
 The Doctrine of God: NGIM Guide to Bible Doctrine, Book 2  (NGIM.org, 2015)
 The Doctrine of Christ: NGIM Guide to Bible Doctrine, Book 3  (NGIM.org, 2016)
 The Doctrine of Creation: NGIM Guide to Bible Doctrine, Book 4  (NGIM.org, 2016)
 The Doctrine of Angels & Demons: NGIM Guide to Bible Doctrine, Book 5  (NGIM.org, 2016)
 Preserving Orthodoxy: Maintaining Continuity with the Historic Christian Faith on Scripture  (Bastion Books, 2017)
 Somewhere Under the Rainbow: A Christian look at Same-Sex “Marriage” (Bastion Books, 2017)
 Having Fun Under the Sun: A Study of Ecclesiastes (Bastion Books, 2018)
 The Collected Work of Norm Geisler, Volumes 1-5 (Bastion Books, 2019) Vol. 1 (1964-1979) | Vol. 2 (19xx-19xx)| Vol. 3 (19xx-19xx)| Vol. 4 (19xx-19xx)| Vol. 5 (19xx-19xx)
 *Conviction without Compromise: Standing Strong in the Core Beliefs of the Christian Faith (NGIM.org, 2021)(An unrevised republishing of #73) 
 Is Man the Measure? An Evaluation of Contemporary Humanism and Transhumanism (Bastion Books, 2021? – Forthcoming)(A major update to and expansion of #18)

Notes

Publications

 .
 .
 .
 .
 .
 .
 .
 .
 .
 .
 .
 .
 .
 .
 .
 .
 .
 .
 .
 .
 .
 .
 .
 .
 .
 .
 .
 .
 .
 .
 .
 .
 .
 .
 .
 .
 .
 .
 .
 .
 .
 .
 .
 .
 .
 .
 .
 .
 .
 .
 .
 .
 .
 .
 .
 .
 .
 .
 .
 .
 .
 .
 .
 .
 .
 .
 .
 .
 .
 .
 .
 .
 .
 .
 .
 .
 .
 .
 .
 .
 .
 .
 .

External links
 
 Bastion Books is the book publishing wing of Geisler Enterprises, LLC. Created by Norm Geisler and Christopher Haun in 2014 to republish Norm's out-of-print books and publish some of his newest books. 
 Norman Geisler International Ministries is a non-profit ministry founded by Norm Geisler and David Geisler in 2014. 
 Defending Inerrancy is a blogsite started by Norm Geisler and Shawn Nelson (with William Roach, F. David Farnell, Joe Holden and others) in 2014 to defend the standards of inerrancy in the ICBI's Chicago Statement on Biblical Inerrancy and the Chicago Statement on Biblical Hermeneutics. 
 .
 .
 .
 .
 .
Critique of Norman Geisler's apologetic scholarship.
Course Christian Apologetics by Dr. Norman Geisler

1932 births
2019 deaths
20th-century evangelicals
20th-century theologians
21st-century evangelicals
21st-century theologians
American Christian creationists
American critics of Islam
American evangelicals
Christian apologists
Christian critics of Islam
Christian Old Earth creationists
Critics of atheism
Critics of new religious movements
Deaths from cerebral thrombosis
Evangelical theologians
Loyola University Chicago alumni
People from Warren, Michigan
Philosophers from Michigan
Philosophers of religion
University and college founders
Wheaton College (Illinois) alumni
William Tyndale College alumni